Croatian Vukovians refers to a group of Croatian linguists that were active at the end of the 19th and the beginning of the 20th century. Their work focused on the standardization of the Croatian variety of Serbo-Croatian language. They were led by Tomislav Maretić, and the most prominent members were Franjo Iveković, Ivan Broz, Pero Budmani, Armin Pavić, Vatroslav Rožić and others.

At the period when Vukovians operated, the issue of a dialectal basis for literary Croatian was not yet settled. Vukovians supported the Neoštokavian Ijekavian dialect (Eastern Herzegovinian dialect) as recorded by Vuk Karadžić and described by Đuro Daničić. They advocated the use of phonological orthography. Through their positions at the Yugoslav Academy of Sciences and Arts and the University of Zagreb they exerted influence on the standardization of literary Croatian.

They published three fundamental works:
 
 
 

Primarily due to political reasons as well as their professional competence, the standardized and orthographic conventions introduced and advocated by Vukovians were dominant at the end of the 19th century, and have shaped the course of the language standardization in Croatia in the first half of the 20th century. In their normative works (Maretić's grammar, Broz's orthography and the Broz–Iveković dictionary) they contributed to the final formation of the Croatian standard on a Neoštokavian dialect basis.

Notes

References

Pranjković, Ivo. "Hrvatski vukovci u Stoljećima hrvatske književnosti (Franjo Iveković, Ivan Broz, Tomo Maretić, Vatroslav Rožić, Milan Rešetar, Antun Radić, Nikola Andrić, Dragutin Boranić: Jezikoslovne rasprave i članci, prir. Marko Samardžija)." Rasprave: Časopis Instituta za hrvatski jezik i jezikoslovlje 28.1 (2002): 403-408.
Alerić, Marko. Conception of the Croatian Standard Language'hrvatskih vukovaca'. Diss. Filozofski fakultet, Sveučilište u Zagrebu, 2001.
Kuna, Branko. "Samardžija, Marko (2002). Nekoć i nedavno. Odabrane teme iz leksikologije i novije povijesti hrvatskoga standardnoga jezika. Rijeka: Izdavački centar." Jezikoslovlje 3.1-2 (2002): 253-257.

19th century in Croatia
20th century in Croatia
Croatian language
Serbian language
Serbo-Croatian language
Yugoslavism